List of solar-powered boats is a list of boats powered by the sun, typically solar panels providing electrical power to motors.

 Aditya (boat), India's First Solar Ferry, 75 passenger boat is operating in Vaikom, Kerala, India. It is the largest solar boat in India. It transports about 350,000 passengers each year. It was built by Navalt Solar and Electric Boats and started operation in the backwaters in Jan, 2017.
Alstersonne is a passenger ferry for 100 persons on the river Alster in Hamburg, Germany. As of year 2000 it was the largest solar-powered ship in the world.
AVALON is a 15 passenger semi-luxury cruise boat on the Conolly canal near Triprayar, Kerala, India. It was built by Navalt Solar and Electric Boats and started operation in the canal in Dec, 2022.
DESTINY is a 30 passenger boat operating in Sukhna_Lake, Chandigarh. It was built by Navalt Solar and Electric Boats and started operation in the lake in Sep, 2022.
Solaris was conceived by David Borton of Solar Sal boats with detail design by Gerr Marine and built by the Hudson River Maritime Museum's restoration crew under the direction of Jim Kricker. This vessel is US Coast Guard certified and the only solar-powered commercial boat in operation on the Hudson River.
EcoCat from the EcoBoat series by MetaltecNaval. Launched in 2018 is a zero emission  commercial passenger boat achieving speeds of up to 9 kn. Currently operating in Santander Bay taking up to 120 passengers on zero emissions tours.
:de:MobiCat - passenger catamaran for 150 passengers, in Switzerland. Used on Lake Biel since 2001
Green Tours 10 is a 10 passenger tourist boat operating in Chakkittapara dam. The boat was built by Navalt Solar and Electric Boats and started operation in the lake in Jan, 2021.
Green Tours 20 is a 20 passenger tourist boat operating in Chakkittapara dam. It was built by Navalt Solar and Electric Boats and started operation in the lake in Jan, 2021.
SolarCat Solar-Electric Catamarans, available on the consumer market, utilize batteries or solar panels. Boats are for individual use or for rental operations. Made in Diamond Springs, CA by Sub Sea Systems, Inc.  FunCat has been rebranded as SolarCat, an individual catamaran powered by both solar panels and batteries.
SB Collinda was the first solar powered vessel to cross the English Channel (in 1997).
SeaZen is a Suncy SolarBoat operated in the Côte d'Azur, between Nice and Monaco. This motor catamaran is the first 100% solar powered boat, operated at sea, for boat tours or for boat rentals.
Solar Sailor shuttles passengers in Sydney harbor Australia
Sun21 sailed the Atlantic from Seville to Miami, and from there to New York. It was the first crossing of the Atlantic powered only by solar.
The Firefly lar boat
Sun CRZ 9 - Compact solar boat in Eranakulam, Kerala, India.
Sun CRZ 30 - Cruise boat for 20 passengers operating in Bathinda Lake, Punjab, India, India.
SunRider - Cruise boat for 10 passengers operating in Kerala, India.
MS Tûranor PlanetSolar, the first vehicle to circumnavigate the globe on solar power (2010–2012), first crossing powered by solar energy of the Indian Ocean, biggest solar boat izine n the world and first crossing of the red sea powered by solar energy
Silent-Yachts series of luxury solar-powered boats. "SILENT-YACHTS presents the first and only oceangoing production yachts in the world that are fully solar sustainable and powered by solar energy. Pure solar-powered luxury"  In 2018 the Solar-Wave 62 was the first production solar boat to successfully complete a transatlantic crossing.
Swe'Pea, a 13 ft dinghy, traveled 120 nmi through the Salish Sea using solar alone at an average speed of 3.1 kn in June 2019.  She is capable of up to 40 nmi on a sunny mid-summer day in the Pacific Northwest.  Her system uses commercially available components; a standard EP Carry outboard system, a solar controller and 200 W of crystalline flex cells.
Wayward Sun (aka Solar Sal 27) is a solar cruiser capable of 6 kn and cruises an average of 4 to 5 kn on solar alone. In the summer of 2021 she was the first 100% solar boat to cruise the Inside Passage from Bellingham, WA to Glacier Bay, AK.
Mundoo 3 is a popular riverboat in Australia, based on the Philip Bolger Tennessee design. An 11m solar electric version has been produced with a 16kW motor and a top speed of 8-9 knots, featured in Wooden Boat magazine number 185.
Iron, from Ecomarine BD, a 100% solar powered catamaran having the international award in its category. Made in Bangladesh. 50 passenger carrying capacity.
Solar Pacific Cruiser designed by SYAS Performance is a 10m all electric catamaran. Designed and built in 2012. It has a top speed of 16 kn and a cruising speed of 8 kn

See also

 Electric boat
 Electric aircraft (including section on solar-powered aircraft)
Solar Splash (Solar-powered boat race)
Frisian Solar Challenge (Solar-powered boat race)
List of large sailing vessels
Human-powered watercraft
Iron, Solar powered catamaran boat in Bangladesh.

References

Solar-powered vehicles
Electric boats
Solar